Persona Mrs. India is national annual beauty pageant event for The most honorable married woman, The persona Mrs India is a beauty pageant to acknowledge and honour Indian women. Director of the organization Mrs. Priyanka Banerjee, Karan Singh Prince and Babita Singh Verma under the banner of Trimakraj Entertainment LLP with Channel Partner Ullu.
Jury member of previous season was Indian television actress Aarti Singh, Akash Choudhary, Karan Khandenwal and Avi Mittal.

History
In 2018 the founder team of Trimakraj Entertainment started the event titled Persona Mrs. India this event is the platform for Indian married woman who endeavor to act naturally.
 This event hold yearly for Indian woman.

Eligibility criteria
Persona Mrs. India eligibility age 23 to 55 years married, divorcee, separated, widow. natural born female.

Persona Mrs. India 2022

Persona Mrs. India 2021
Persona Mrs. India 2021 Season 4 Grand Finale.

References

Beauty pageants in India